The 1993–94 Montreal Canadiens season was the team's 85th season of play. The defending Stanley Cup champions could not repeat, being eliminated in the Eastern Conference Quarterfinals by the Boston Bruins four games to three. It was the last time at the Forum that the playoffs were played. In addition, it was the first time in 11 years that the Canadiens did not advance past the first round of the playoffs.

Off-season
In the off-season, Patrick Roy signed a new four-year, $16 million contract.

NHL Draft

Regular season
For the season, Roy had 35 wins, 17 losses and 11 ties. Without him in net, the Canadiens had 6 wins, 12 losses and 3 ties. The Canadiens ended on the season on a sour note. They had 3 wins and 9 losses in their last 12 games, including a 9–0 loss to the Detroit Red Wings. Vincent Damphousse finished the season with 40 goals, the last time a Canadiens player achieved the feat as of 2020.

Season standings

Neutral Site Games

Schedule and results

Playoffs

Round 1: (4) Boston Bruins vs. (5) Montreal Canadiens

Player statistics

Regular season
Scoring

Goaltending

Playoffs
Scoring

Goaltending

Awards and records

Transactions

Draft picks
Montreal's draft picks at the 1993 NHL Entry Draft held at the Quebec Coliseum in Quebec City, Quebec.

Farm teams

See also
 1993–94 NHL season

References
Canadiens on Hockey Database
Canadiens on NHL Reference

Montreal Canadiens seasons
M
M